Global surveillance refers to the practice of globalized mass surveillance on entire populations across national borders. Although its existence was first revealed in the 1970s and led legislators to attempt to curb domestic spying by the National Security Agency (NSA), it did not receive sustained public attention until the existence of ECHELON was revealed in the 1980s and confirmed in the 1990s. In 2013 it gained substantial worldwide media attention due to the global surveillance disclosure by Edward Snowden.

History

1970s 
In 1972 NSA analyst Perry Fellwock (under the pseudonym "Winslow Peck") introduced the readers of Ramparts magazine to the NSA and the UKUSA Agreement. In 1976, a separate article in Time Out magazine revealed the existence of the GCHQ.

1980s–1990s 
In 1982 James Bamford's book about the NSA, The Puzzle Palace, was first published. Bamford's second book, Body of Secrets: Anatomy of the Ultra-Secret National Security Agency, was published two decades later.

In 1988 the ECHELON network was revealed by Margaret Newsham, a Lockheed employee. Newsham told a member of the U.S. Congress that telephone calls of Strom Thurmond, a Republican U.S. senator, were being collected by the NSA. Congressional investigators determined that "targeting of U.S. political figures would not occur by accident. But was designed into the system from the start."

By the late 1990s ECHELON was reportedly capable of monitoring up to 90% of all internet traffic. According to the BBC in May 2001, however, "The US Government still refused to admit that Echelon even exists."

2000s 

In the aftermath of the September 11 attacks, William Binney, along with colleagues J. Kirke Wiebe and Edward Loomis and in cooperation with House staffer Diane Roark, asked the U.S. Defense Department to investigate the NSA for allegedly wasting "millions and millions of dollars" on Trailblazer, a system intended to analyze data carried on communications networks such as the Internet. Binney was also publicly critical of the NSA for spying on U.S. citizens after the September 11, 2001 attacks. Binney claimed that the NSA had failed to uncover the 9/11 plot despite its massive interception of data.

In 2001, after the September 11 attacks, MI5 started collecting bulk telephone communications data in the United Kingdom (i.e. what telephone numbers called each other and when) and authorized the Home Secretary under the Telecommunications Act 1984 instead of the Regulation of Investigatory Powers Act 2000, which would have brought independent oversight and regulation. This was kept secret until announced by the then Home Secretary in 2015.

On December 16, 2005, The New York Times published a report under the headline "Bush Lets U.S. Spy on Callers Without Courts," which was co-written by Eric Lichtblau and the Pulitzer Prize-winning journalist James Risen. According to The Times, the article's date of publication was delayed for a year (past the next presidential election cycle) because of alleged national security concerns. Russ Tice was later revealed as a major source.

In 2006, further details of the NSA's domestic surveillance of U.S. citizens was provided by USA Today. The newspaper released a report on May 11, 2006 detailing the NSA's "massive database" of phone records collected from "tens of millions" of U.S. citizens. According to USA Today, these phone records were provided by several telecom companies such as AT&T, Verizon, and BellSouth. AT&T technician Mark Klein was later revealed as major source, specifically of rooms at network control centers on the internet backbone intercepting and recording all traffic passing through. In 2008 the security analyst Babak Pasdar revealed the existence of the so-called "Quantico circuit" that he and his team had set up in 2003. The circuit provided the U.S. federal government with a backdoor into the network of an unnamed wireless provider, which was later independently identified as Verizon.

In 2007, former Qwest CEO Joseph Nacchio alleged in court and provided supporting documentation that in February 2001 (nearly 7 months prior to the September 11 attacks) that the NSA proposed in a meeting to conduct blanket phone spying. He considered the spying to be illegal and refused to cooperate, and claims that the company was punished by being denied lucrative contracts.

2010–2013 

In 2011 details of the mass surveillance industry were released by WikiLeaks. According to Julian Assange, "We are in a world now where not only is it theoretically possible to record nearly all telecommunications traffic out of a country, all telephone calls, but where there is an international industry selling the devices now to do it."

Disclosures since 2013

See also 
 History of surveillance
 NSA warrantless surveillance (2001–07)
 Global surveillance whistleblowers

References 

Global surveillance
News leaks
Articles containing video clips
Surveillance scandals